Quaresma may refer to:

the Portuguese name for Lent in the Christian calendar
Virgínia Quaresma (1882-1973), Portuguese journalist
Artur Quaresma, (1917–2011), Portuguese footballer
Alfredo Quaresma, (born 1944), Portuguese footballer
Ediglê Quaresma Farias, (born 1978), Brazilian footballer
Ricardo Quaresma, (born 1983), Portuguese footballer
Mateus Quaresma (born 1995), Brazilian footballer
Eduardo Quaresma (born 2002), Portuguese footballers
Quaresma, a film that won a Portuguese Golden Globe in 2004